ITU School of Textile Technologies and Design is one of the ITU schools in Gumussuyu campus. It is the first and the single one offering textile engineering education in Istanbul, and also comes first among the top textile engineering schools in Turkey. Its history could be traced back to 1955. There are three undergraduate programs under Textile Engineering Department:
 Textile Engineering Program
 Fashion and Design Program
 Textile Development and Marketing Program
ITU School of Textile Technologies and Design is a member of Association of Universities for Textiles(AUTEX)

References

External links
 ITU School of Textile Technologies and Design, English
 ITU School of Textile Technologies and Design, Turkish
 Info about Textile engineering program

Istanbul Technical University
Textile schools